The 59th Annual TV Week Logie Awards were held on Sunday 23 April 2017 at the Crown Palladium in Melbourne, and broadcast live on the Nine Network. Public voting for the Best Award categories began on 20 November 2016 and ended on 18 December 2016.

Following the return of the Logie Award for Best Factual Program category at the 2016 Logie Awards, the 2017 Awards reinstated the category of Logie Award for Most Outstanding Factual or Documentary Program, which is not a publicly voted category.

Dannii Minogue was named as 2017 Logies ambassador.

Nominees & Winners
Nominees were announced on 26 March 2017.

Gold Logie

Acting/Presenting

Best Programs

Most Outstanding Programs

Network Nominations

Presenters

Dave Hughes
Hamish & Andy
Rachel Griffiths
Alex Dimitriades
Carrie Bickmore
Dannii Minogue
Delta Goodrem
Tina Arena
Erik Thomson
Rebecca Maddern
Claudia Karvan
Daniel Wyllie
Shaun Micallef
Mandy McElhinney
Ita Buttrose
Miranda Tapsell
Liz Hayes
Amanda Keller
Peter Helliar
Larry Emdur
Shane Jacobson
Ben Mingay
Pamela Rabe
Leigh Sales
Todd Sampson
Sam Pang with Lorrae Desmond
Ben Fordham

Performers

Andy Grammer
Casey Donovan
James Blunt
Jessica Mauboy

In Memoriam
Ross Higgins actor, Kingswood Country

References

External links

2017
2017 television awards
2017 in Australian television
2010s in Melbourne
2017 awards in Australia